Damage Control is a fictional construction company appearing in American comic books published by Marvel Comics. The company specializes in repairing the property damage caused by conflicts between superheroes and supervillains. Three Damage Control limited series have been published.

Damage Control employees have been in the middle of a breakout at the Vault, confronted Doctor Doom, have been threatened with death by the Punisher, and have met vastly powerful cosmic entities such as the Silver Surfer and Galactus. They have "fought" side by side with the X-Men, socialized with the New Warriors, and were even almost menaced by the Hulk.

Damage Control has appeared in various media adaptations, including the Marvel Cinematic Universe (MCU) films Spider-Man: Homecoming and Spider-Man: No Way Home, and the Disney+ television series Ms. Marvel (2022) and She-Hulk: Attorney at Law (2022).

Publication history
Dwayne McDuffie, who co-created the concept with artist Ernie Colón and wrote Damage Control's initial stories, pitched Damage Control to Marvel as "a sitcom within the Marvel Universe".

Damage Control employees first appear in a five-page story, "The Sales Pitch," in 1988's Marvel Age Annual, and reappeared in 1989 in a serialized 7-page story published in the anthology comic Marvel Comics Presents #19. Subsequently, the employees of Damage Control have been the subject of three four-issue comic book limited series published between 1989 and 1991: Damage Control (May - August 1989) and Damage Control vol. 2 (December 1989 - February 1990, with two issues in December), both by writer McDuffie and penciler Colón, and vol. 3 (June - September 1991) by writer McDuffie and penciler and inker Kyle Baker.

Damage Control was featured in an entry in the Official Handbook of the Marvel Universe Update '89 #2.

Among its later appearances were those in the 2006 storyline "Civil War”; the series Irredeemable Ant-Man; and the first issue of World War Hulk Aftersmash: Damage Control, a three-issue limited series tying into the 2008 "World War Hulk" storyline.

Fictional history
Damage Control was founded by Anne Marie Hoag and was originally owned by Tony Stark and Wilson Fisk, each owning half the stock of the company, though Stark felt uneasy cooperating with Fisk, a notorious criminal. The company was headquartered in New York's Flatiron Building.

When Ms. Hoag was offered a job in government, she nominated Robin Chapel as her replacement. Stark and Fisk sold their stock in Damage Control: Stark because he did not want to be associated with Fisk and Fisk because he had no confidence in Robin's ability to lead the company. Another company, Carlton Co, took control of Damage Control and tried to make Damage Control more profitable, but in the process angered a lot of employees and nearly ruined Damage Control. Ms. Hoag convinced S.H.I.E.L.D. to invest in Damage Control and they loaned her the money to buy back the company. S.H.I.E.L.D. also found out that the sale of Damage Control had been a plot by Fisk to buy back the company for cheap. During the events of Acts of Vengeance (an event Fisk helped organize), massive damage was done to the city and Fisk made a large profit when Damage Control was hired to repair the damages.

The confrontation with the Kingpin causes unexpected results. The Damage Control staff find that a movie has been put out, a fictionalized version of their confrontation with the Kingpin. At the wrap party for the premiere, the Damage Control staff is summoned by the Silver Surfer to help deal with Edifice Rex, a former employee. He had gained cosmic powers and this, combined with an anal-retentive personality, threatens the cosmos. Several of the employees meet and discuss the problem with other cosmic entities, such as Galactus and Lord Chaos. Robin Chapel eventually solves this problem by firing Rex.

After a super-fight destroys the Washington Monument Damage Control is contracted and fixes the damage off-panel. Their bill is seen in a pile of paperwork.

Hercules is seen working with Damage Control, on one occasion serving a community service sentence levied as punishment for a drunken rampage. Hercules becomes a full-fledged employee, forced to earn a living after the Constrictor successfully sues the demigod for injuries incurred in his apprehension.

Damage Control is seen during the Civil War. The super-villain Nitro, who blew up the town of Stamford, killing hundreds and starting the Civil War, reveals that a "Walter Declun" has provided him with Mutant Growth Hormone. Via Namor, Wolverine learns Walter is the CEO of Damage Control, Inc. A brief scene shows that Walter and one other employee of the firm are complicit in using Nitro to boost the firm's profits.

This leads Wolverine to Anne-Marie Hoag, Damage Control's President (and a brief confrontation with Ann, long-time D.C. receptionist). Anne-Marie reveals that Declun and his investors took a controlling share of the stock after the company went public to obtain more funds. D.C. has also obtained the Stamford reconstruction contract and the contract to train and evaluate registered super-beings. Anne-Marie has suspected Declun of illegal activities but did not have strong enough evidence to counter his ties with Washington D.C. and the President.

In his battle against Declun and Damage Control, which includes destroying many D.C. assets such as company equipment to robbing overseas banks with D.C. Holdings to forcing major stockholders to liquidate their stock. Wolverine later engages in a fight with a team of D.C. Security personnel who are equipped with Mandroid Armor, S.H.I.E.L.D. weaponry, Stark Enterprises technology and other items salvaged from superhuman fights until the super-hero Sentry shows up and captures Wolverine, who is then delivered to SHIELD, which is under Maria Hill's leadership. But Wolverine later escapes. After making his way back to Damage Control offices, he confronts Declun, at which point the corrupt businessman takes a dose of Mutant Growth Hormone in response to Wolverine's threats; temporally giving him super-human powers. During the fight Wolverine appears to kill Declun by stabbing him through his eye sockets. However, Declun survives the fight.

John Porter also becomes involved with the Civil War. When FF members Susan and Reed Richards temporarily separate over ethical differences, their emotional split-up was punctuated by Susan using her force fields to punch a three-foot circular hole through every floor of the building. Porter then shows up and estimates the repairs will be $789,000. He also thanks Reed for the work as lately.

Damage Control creates a new division called, "Search and Rescue" that focuses on finding survivors in wreckage. They inadvertently hire Eric O'Grady, thinking he is a hero called "Slaying Mantis", but he was actually looting after a Mighty Avengers battle.

The company helped clean up New York City after the events of World War Hulk. Tom Foster, the nephew of Bill Foster and the new Goliath, joins the company, as do fellow superhumans Monstro and Visioneer. The undamaged Flatiron Building is once again used as their headquarters. As a company, Damage Control secures all relevant resources and a makeshift superhero rescue force, as many people were left behind when New York was evacuated for the events of 'World War Hulk'. Damage Control also collects various extraordinary resources left behind from the confrontation, such as the adamantium "bullets", an alien A.I. and alien metals.

During the reconstruction, a strange side-effect of one of the Hulk's destroyed machines causes the Chrysler Building to come to life. It wants to leave the city and see the world, but John Porter is able to negotiate a deal by which it is allowed to leave one month a year; as John notes, no one comes to Manhattan in August.

The company again gets the bid to rebuild Avengers Mansion just as a new team, led by Luke Cage, is moving in. Ms. Hoag hints at a secret past with Cage.

During the Spider-Island storyline, Damage Control is seen working with the superheroes to clean up the destruction and chaos caused by the madness of a giant spider monster in the middle of Manhattan. Along with passing out pants to formerly spider-shaped New Yorkers, Damage set to work carting away parts of the Spider Queen's giant arachnid body. At least one Damage Control team had been infiltrated and controlled by the Jackal, a self-admitted mad scientist who wanted DNA from the spider monster.

During the Civil War II storyline, Monstro finds Trull the Unhuman vandalizing Damage Control equipment and busts him. Upon Monstro empathizing him, Trull the Unhuman was convinced to give up on his goals. Trull the Unhuman joined up with Damage Control and became their spokesperson.

Employees

Main characters
 Anne Marie Hoag: Founder and first director of Damage Control, an elderly lady, she is good friends with then-S.H.I.E.L.D. director Nick Fury and convinced him that S.H.I.E.L.D. should loan her the money to buy Damage Control's stock. Current owner of Damage Control.
 Hercules: Did community service with Damage Control before, but seen as a regular employee for Damage Control, after losing much of his godly riches to the Constrictor in an excessive force lawsuit. Hercules works on construction and demolition.
 Robin Chapel: Traffic manager and Ms. Hoag's most trusted employee. She initially had a rivalry with John Porter, because he was hired to fill a position for which she had applied. Over time, the two became good friends, and by the time of the fourth series, they are romantically involved. Robin is very capable and ambitious, but is a friendly person underneath her businesslike exterior. Temporarily thrown out by Walter Declun's manipulations, she was recently rehired as CEO of Damage Control.
 Albert Cleary: Comptroller, Albert is a financial genius and always keeps a cool head, even when presenting bills to the likes of Doctor Doom. He possesses the uncanny ability never to wrinkle his suit. Doctor Doom at one time offers Cleary a job. Cleary politely turned down the offer. Doom respected Cleary's decision enough to let him live. Although Cleary will never admit it, he found his encounter with Doom unnerving.
 John Porter: Account executive, worked independently in "superhero insurance", but was offered a job by Ms. Hoag. He initially had a rivalry with Robin Chapel, but the two have become good friends and he has expressed a romantic interest in her. John has the ability to find peaceful, practical solutions to the most complicated problems. Has an odd, peaceful relationship with notorious villain Thunderball.
 Bart Rozum: Former intern, offered a full-term contract as personal assistant to Robin Chapel. Infatuated with the receptionist Anne. He is named for John Rozum. Good friend with Robbie Baldwin, AKA Speedball/Penance, a former D.C. employee. This friendship allows him to negotiate the use of superhumans in rebuilding New York after 'World War Hulk'.
 Eugene "Gene" Strausser: Technician, briefly became an armored supervillain when Damage Control's new board of directors fired him; with an ally, he even attacked She-Hulk. Was rehired when Ms. Hoag regained control. He served the required jail time for his misdeeds on a work-release basis, thanks to his "former boss", Nick Fury, pulling some strings on his behalf. Later, completely freed from his legal obligations to assist in the 'World War Hulk' damage.
 Trull the Unhuman: The essence of an alien in a steam shovel who became Damage Control's spokesperson.

Search and Rescue division
 Lenny Ballinger: Currently the leader of Damage Control's Search-and-Rescue division. He is a middle-aged man. Lenny's no-nonsense attitude has made him very popular with his crew. During a strike action, he even took their side in a strike against Carlton Co, who had offered him a large amount of money to do the opposite. Although occasionally mistaken for actor Lee Marvin, Lenny feels he looks more like Paul Newman.
 Tom Foster / Goliath: Nephew of Bill Foster / Black Goliath. Joined Damage Control following World War Hulk.
 Frank Johnson / Monstro: A former firefighter who lived a nomadic life before joining the team.
 Abigail Dunton / Visioneer: She has low level psychic abilities and assists in locating civilians trapped in rubble. She has a brief romantic relationship with Eric O'Grady.
 Eric O'Grady / Slaying Mantis: Eric O'Grady was a member of the Search-And-Rescue team in the guise of Slaying Mantis. Damage Control had no knowledge that he was secretly Ant-Man.

Other employees
 Anne: Receptionist. A voluptuous, raven haired woman and the object of Bart's affection. She was initially an air-headed woman who spent her time talking to friends, but developed into a sarcastic, competent woman. 
 Henry Ackerdson: Head of marketing, not very popular because of his idea that every employee should wear superhero costumes, but eventually accepted as part of the team; first appeared in Marvel Age Annual #4.
 Robbie Baldwin / Speedball: Briefly worked as an intern for Damage Control.
 Walter Declun: A ruthless corporate raider who bought out controlling shares of Damage Control when it went public, he tried manipulating supervillains to increase property damage, and therefore Damage Control's workload and profits. Indirectly responsible for the Stamford Incident by giving Nitro a Mutant Growth Hormone. He ultimately had his shares bought out and was then immediately fired by Hoag (with Tony Stark's help) followed by Walter being impaled in the head by Wolverine's claws. In The Amazing Spider-Man Annual #1, it was revealed that Walter Declun survived the attack. Walter Declun has since resurfaced in the "Doomwar" limited series acting as a majordomo to Doctor Doom.
 Kirk Eden: Partner of Jim Palmetto. Assigned to the Bronx to report on any damage caused by the Ghost Rider.
 Gloria Clark: Personal liaison to Kid Kaiju following the events of Monsters Unleashed.
 Jay: Head of security.
 Marie Leahy: Account executive from Tokyo, Japan.
 Ray Lippert: Former representative of Carlton Co. who stayed with Damage Control after Carlton sold the company.
 Kathleen O’Meara: Vice-president, brief love interest for Ben Grimm.
 Jim Palmetto: Partner of Kirk Eden, assigned to the Bronx to report on any damage caused by the Ghost Rider.
 Vincent "Vinnie" Patilio / Leap-Frog: Former super-villain who briefly was employed by Damage Control. Eugene Strausser made some improvements on the Leap-Frog suit.
 Rex Randolph / Edifice Rex: Former employee, who found an artifact that gave him cosmic powers. As the anal retentive cosmic being Edifice Rex, Rex tried to clean up the universe by uncreating it, but was stopped by Robin Chapel, who fired him.

Other versions

Ultimate Marvel
In the Ultimate Marvel Universe, Damage Control is also a construction and demolition company. The Ultimate version of the Wrecking Crew are employees of Damage Control as debuted in Ultimate Spider-Man #86. They are then empowered and quit the business to become villains.

In other media

Television
 Damage Control appears in The Super Hero Squad Show episode "Hulk Talk Smack". They are hired by Iron Man to rebuild the Super Hero City Library after a battle between the Super Hero Squad and Doctor Doom's minions Klaw and Screaming Mimi.
 Damage Control appears in the Ultimate Spider-Man episode "Damage". Following a fight between the Wrecking Crew against Spider-Man and his fellow S.H.I.E.L.D. trainees, Nick Fury orders the heroes to work with Damage Control to figure out the villains' motives as well as clean up the damage they caused. While doing so, Spider-Man discovers the Wrecking Crew infiltrated Damage Control and used their resources to commit a covert bank robbery before joining forces with Damage Control CEO Mac Porter (voiced by Kevin Michael Richardson) to stop them. The series' version of Porter is designed to resemble Damage Control creator Dwayne McDuffie, who had died from complications following heart surgery. As such, the episode was also dedicated to his memory.
 In October 2015, ABC ordered a put pilot for the live-action Marvel Television comedy series Damage Control. The series was being developed by Ben Karlin, who was also writing the script for the project and served as executive producer. The series had previously been implied by then ABC Entertainment president Paul Lee to have begun airing as early as the 2016–17 television season. However, since then, there have been no further announcements.

Marvel Cinematic Universe

Damage Control appears in the live-action Marvel Cinematic Universe films Spider-Man: Homecoming (2017) and Spider-Man: No Way Home (2021), and the Disney+ television series Ms. Marvel (2022) and She-Hulk: Attorney at Law (2022). This version is a government agency called the U.S. Department of Damage Control (D.O.D.C.), which was created as a joint venture between Stark Industries and the United States government to clean up after the Battle of New York. Employees who appear in the MCU include: Anne Marie Hoag (portrayed by Tyne Daly in Homecoming), agent P. Cleary (portrayed by Arian Moayed in No Way Home and Ms. Marvel), agent Foster (portrayed by Gary Weeks in Homecoming and No Way Home), and agent Sadie Deever (portrayed by Alysia Reiner in Ms. Marvel). Damage Control was first referenced in the third season of the Marvel Television series Agents of S.H.I.E.L.D..

Video games
 Damage Control workers appear in Lego Marvel Super Heroes.
 Damage Control workers appear in Lego Marvel's Avengers, with one such individual being a playable character.
 A Damage Control building appears in Marvel's Spider-Man.
 A virtual reality game called Avengers: Damage Control was released and hosted in select United States cities, Canada and Malaysia.

Collected editions

References

External links
 Damage Control at Marvel.com
 
 Damage Control at the Marvel Comics Database

Characters created by Dwayne McDuffie
Fictional organizations in Marvel Comics
Marvel Comics superhero teams
Marvel Comics titles